Peter-Michael Kolbe (born 2 August 1953) is a retired German rower who specialized in the single sculls. In this event, between 1975 and 1988 he won five world titles and three Olympic silver medals, in 1976, 1984 and 1988; he missed the 1980 Games because of their boycott by West Germany. His career is known for the rivalry with Pertti Karppinen that stretched for 14 years.

Biography
At the 1974 World Rowing Championships in Lucerne, Kolbe won bronze with the coxed four. In 1975, he won his first World Rowing Championship in the single scull. He was named West German Sportsman of the year for this achievement. He went into the 1976 Olympics as the favorite. On the day of the Olympic finals, the wind was fierce and the course difficult.  Kolbe led the entire race only to be passed in the closing moments by Karppinen who had trailed badly during the early portions of the race. Kolbe's reward was a silver medal.

West Germany boycotted the 1980 Summer Olympics to protest the Soviet Union's invasion of Afghanistan. Kolbe left the single scull and rowed in the West German national eight (8+), which raced in several European events. His rival Karppinen won the gold medal at the Olympics.

At the 1984 Olympics, Kolbe faced his rival Karppinen once again. Kolbe fought for and got the lead early in the race.  He slowly began pulling away from the other rowers. Karppinen languished far back. Over the last thousand meters of the race, Kolbe continued to pull away from the pack, but Karppinen was inching his way back into the race. In the last 150 meters of the race, Karppinen caught an exhausted Kolbe and went on to win his third gold medal.

In both the 1976 and 1984 Olympics, Karppinen and Kolbe separated themselves from the pack turning a multi-boat race into a two boat match. They were the two best scullers in the world. They raced each other many other times and their races were well rowed and hard fought. Unlike the Olympics, Kolbe, more often than not, beat his rival at the World Championships.

At the 1988 Olympics, Kolbe finally beat Karppinen at the Olympics, but there was a new sculling sensation. Thomas Lange won the race with Kolbe again getting silver, and Karppinen not even making the finals.

Kolbe was consistently fast. In all Kolbe's Olympic and World Championship races, only Karppinen, Lange and Andrew Sudduth were ever able to beat Kolbe in a regularly rigged boat.

In 1982, Kolbe moved to Oslo to be with his Norwegian wife, a journalist whom he met at the 1975 World Championships. He later returned to Germany and in 1994 became director of the German Rowing Federation.

In July 2016, Kolbe was inducted into Germany's Sports Hall of Fame.

References

External links
 
 
 
 

1953 births
West German male rowers
Rowers at the 1976 Summer Olympics
Rowers at the 1984 Summer Olympics
Rowers at the 1988 Summer Olympics
Olympic rowers of West Germany
Medalists at the 1976 Summer Olympics
Medalists at the 1984 Summer Olympics
Medalists at the 1988 Summer Olympics
Olympic medalists in rowing
Olympic silver medalists for West Germany
Rowers from Hamburg
Living people
World Rowing Championships medalists for West Germany
European Rowing Championships medalists